This is a list of some programs that have been or are being broadcast by Norwegian Broadcasting Corporation (NRK) on the NRK1, NRK2, NRK3 or NRK Super television channels. Included are national radio programs.  The list is incomplete.  There may be many years ago that the programs were shown.



0-9

A

B

C

D

E

F

G

H

I

J

K

L

M

N

O

P

Q

R

S

T

U

V

W

X

Y

Z

Æ

Ø

Å

External links
NRK Archive 

Norwegia Broadcasting Corporation
NRK original programming
Norwegian Broadcasting Corp